Mabel Caroline Taylor Brummel (December 7, 1879 – July 1, 1967) was an American archer.  She took part in the women's double National round and the women's double Columbia round at the 1904 Summer Olympics. Her sister was Leonie Taylor who competed against her at the same games.

References

External links
 

1879 births
1967 deaths
American female archers
Olympic archers of the United States
Archers at the 1904 Summer Olympics
Sportspeople from Cincinnati